The 2016–17 Segunda División B season was the 40th since its establishment. The first matches of the season were played in August 2016, and the season ended in June 2017 with the promotion play-off finals.

Overview before the season
80 teams will join the league, including four relegated from the 2015–16 Segunda División and 18 promoted from the 2015–16 Tercera División. The composition of the groups is a proposal of the Royal Spanish Football Federation that was confirmed on 15 July 2016.

Relegated from Segunda División
Ponferradina
Llagostera
Albacete
Bilbao Athletic
Promoted from Tercera División

At. Mancha Real
At. Sanluqueño
Boiro
Caudal
Córdoba B
El Ejido
Extremadura
Gavà
Mallorca B
Mutilvera
Navalcarnero
Osasuna B
Palencia
Prat
Saguntino
SS Reyes
San Fernando
Zamudio

Group 1

Stadia and locations

League table

Results

Top goalscorers
Last updated 14 May 2017

Top goalkeepers
Last updated 14 May 2017

Group 2

Stadia and locations

League table

Results

Top goalscorers
Last updated 14 May 2017

Top goalkeepers
Last updated 14 May 2017

Group 3

Stadia and locations

League table

Results

Top goalscorers
Last updated 14 May 2017

Top goalkeepers
Last updated 14 May 2017

Group 4

Stadia and locations

League table

Results

Top goalscorers
Last updated 14 May 2017

Top goalkeepers
Last updated 14 May 2017

Attendance data
This is a list of attendance data of the teams that give an official number. They include playoffs games:

|}
Notes:
1: Team played last season in Segunda División.

Notes

References

External links
Royal Spanish Football Federation

 

 
2016-17
3
Spa